The Rt. Rev. George Stephen Jayaraj was consecrated new Bishop of the Madras Diocese of the Church of South India (CSI) by the Most Reverend Dr. G. Dyvasirvadam, Moderator, CSI on 19 March 2016 at St. George's Cathedral, Chennai. He became the thirteenth Bishop of the Madras Diocese.

J. George Stephen, was brought up in a small village named  Cheyyur close to Arakkonam. He was ordained as a Presbyter in 1984, and has served in churches in urban and rural parishes.

Rt. Rev. George Stephen Jayaraj, M.A. B.D. is married to Mrs. N. Yamuna and has two daughters: Miss Stepheya  Sandhana and Miss Stephena George.

References

Church of South India clergy
Living people
People from Kanchipuram district
Year of birth missing (living people)
Indian bishops
Anglican bishops of Madras